Amir-e Sofla (also Romanized as Amīr-e Soflá; also known as Amīr, Amīrī-ye Pā’īn, Sarāb-e Amīr, and Sarāb-i-Amīr) is a village in Qaleh-ye Mozaffari Rural District, in the Central District of Selseleh County, Lorestan Province, Iran. At the 2006 census, its population was 773, in 165 families.

References 

Towns and villages in Selseleh County